Marc Dion Sédé (born 10 September 1987) is an Ivorian professional footballer who last played as a midfielder for  club Tripoli. Sédé can play as central midfielder or a central forward.

Sédé began his youth career at Académie de Sol Beni, before joining the senior team of ASEC Mimosas in 2005.

References

1987 births
Living people
Ivorian footballers
ASEC Mimosas players
Footballers from Abidjan
EO Sidi Bouzid players
Islah Borj Al Shmali Club players
AC Tripoli players
Lebanese Premier League players
Expatriate footballers in Lebanon
Ivorian expatriate footballers
Ivorian expatriate sportspeople in Lebanon
Association football midfielders
Ivory Coast A' international footballers
2011 African Nations Championship players